T. formosa may refer to:

 Tatargina formosa, an Asian moth
 Tephritis formosa, a fruit fly
 Terebra formosa, an auger snail
 Tetracis formosa, a geometer moth
 Tima formosa, a marine hydrozoan
 Tirumala formosa, an African butterfly
 Trypeta formosa, a fruit fly
 Turbonilla formosa, a sea snail